The Rio de Janeiro Petrochemical Complex, (abbreviated as COMPERJ), is a petrochemical facility in Itaboraí, Rio de Janeiro, Brazil built by Petrobras on a 45 km2 piece of land making it the largest single enterprise by Petrobras and one of the largest industrial facilities in the world. It was heavily involved in Operation Car Wash, a large and widespread criminal investigation by Brazilian police, to which its license of operation was revoked leading to high numbers of unemployment and debt.

Operation 
The facility contains a refining unit with a processing capacity of 165,000 barrels of oil per day. Initially, it was planned to use heavy oil from the Marlim oil field located in Campos Basin, a few kilometers north of Rio de Janeiro. In addition to the refining unit, a first-generation basic petrochemicals unit (ethylene , benzene , p-xylene and propylene) and six second-generation petrochemicals units were planned to be built. The main thermoplastic resins to be produced by the second generation petrochemical units will be polypropylene (850 thousand tons/year), polyethylene (800 thousand tons/year) and polyethylene terephthalate.(600 thousand tons/year).

In addition to the production units, a large utility center will be built, responsible for supplying water, steam and electrical energy necessary for the operation of the complex.

See also 

 Arco Metropolitano do Rio de Janeiro
 Campos Basin oil spill
 Corruption in Brazil

References

External links 

 COMPERJ's official website

Oil refineries in Brazil
Petrobras